Norashen is a village in the Sevan Municipality of the Gegharkunik Province of Armenia. The village has a church and a cemetery.

Etymology 
The village was previously known as Efendi.

History 
The town was founded in 1920 on the site of the former village of Rahmankendi.

Gallery

References

External links 

 
 
 

Populated places in Gegharkunik Province
Populated places established in 1920